Kelch-like protein 12 is a protein that in humans is encoded by the KLHL12 gene.

Interactions 

KLHL12 has been shown to interact with RIT1 and CUL3.

References

Further reading 

 
 
 
 
 
 

Kelch proteins